Pokrovka is a rural locality (a village) and the administrative centre of Pokrovsky Selsoviet, Fyodorovsky District, Bashkortostan, Russia. The population was 195 as of 2010. There are 2 streets.

Geography 
Pokrovka is located 20 km northwest of Fyodorovka (the district's administrative centre) by road. Ilyinovka is the nearest rural locality.

References 

Rural localities in Fyodorovsky District